Kanga may refer to:

Places 
 Kanga, Tanzania, a ward of Chunya District
 Kangavar, a city in Kermanshah Province, Iran

People 
 Guélor Kanga, Gabonese footballer
 Hormasji Kanga (1880–1945), Indian cricketer
 Kanga Cricket League, Indian cricket league named after Hormasji Kanga
 Wilfried Kanga, French footballer
 John Kennedy Sr. (nicknamed Kanga) (1928–2020), Australian rules footballer
 Dale Tryon, Baroness Tryon (nicknamed Kanga) (1948–1997), British businesswoman

Other 
 Kangaroo, the Australian animal and icon
 Kanga people, an ethnic minority in Sudan
 Kanga language, spoken by the Kanga people
 Kanga (garment), a sheet of fabric worn by women in East Africa
 Kanga (comics), a fictional species of kangaroos in DC Comics
 Kangha, a small wooden comb that is supposed to be kept with the hair at all times
 "Kanga" (song), a 2018 song by 6ix9ine from the album Dummy Boy
 Kanga (Winnie-the-Pooh), a character in the children's book Winnie the Pooh
 Kanga Loaders, an Australian brand of compact utility loaders
 Kanga, nickname of Dale Tryon, Baroness Tryon (1948–1997), and the name of her clothing line
 KANGA, the callsign for V Australia Airlines

See also
 Canga (disambiguation)
 Kenga (disambiguation)
 KangaROOS, an American brand of sneaker
 Kangas (surname)